De-Javu was an Italian house duo founded by Dario Melodia, Riccardo Piparo, Francesco Abbate and Alessandro Bunetto.

Discography

Singles

"I Can't Stop" music video was released by Warner Music.

References

External links
 Entry for Galleon on Discogs.com

Musical groups established in 2001
House music duos
Italian musical duos
Electronic dance music duos